Game Goabaone Bantsi (born 22 July 1986), better known by his stage name Zeus, is a Motswana hip-hop artist, MC and businessman.
Zeus released his debut album Freshly Baked in 2008 which included the hits "Back in the days" and "Gijima". 
The album was generally well received and garnered him a Channel O Music Video award nomination and win in the Best Hip Hop video for the aforementioned "Gijima".
His sophomore offering, 2009's The Flipside has been positively reviewed in both his home country as well as neighbouring South Africa. 
In 2010, he was ranked seventh in a list of the Top 15 South African Rappers and 4th on MNET's Top 10 African Rappers for 2010 compilation. 
Zeus currently splits his time between Gaborone, which is his hometown, and Johannesburg, South Africa.

Early life 
Zeus was born in Serowe and raised in Gaborone, the capital and largest city of Botswana. He has three siblings; two brothers and one sister and is the last born in the family of 4.
On the musical tastes of his family members, he once stated in an interview,
"My mother religiously loves gospel, my father is a fan of country music, my two brothers love hip-hop and dancehall respectively and my sister digs R&B. So, all sorts of music I was exposed to when growing up influenced the album."
Zeus grew up in a Christian household and still identifies himself as a Christian.

Education 
Zeus completed his secondary school education at Rainbow High School, an independent school located in Gaborone in 2003. Thereafter he embarked upon a BCOMM in Marketing and Management degree at Monash University South Africa, graduating in 2007.

Music career 

In the early 2000s, a teenage Zeus began making a name for himself in the hip-hop scene in Botswana. His natural talent, flare, eloquence and refusal to be content with being "just another rapper" made him difficult to brush aside.
2008 saw his years of hard work come to fruition as his debut effort hit the shelves.

2008–2009: Freshly Baked 
In 2008, Zeus released his first album, Freshly Baked. 
The fourteen track record was met with very good reviews in Botswana and propelled him to star status in his homeland.
Later that year, Zeus received crossover success when Freshly Baked was nominated for album of the year at the MTN-HYPE magazine Hip Hop awards in South Africa. This further solidified his talent as artist and widened the spectrum of his appeal.
2008 continued to be a good year for Zeus as the song that first put him on the map, "Imagination", was also nominated for the Best Reggae Dancehall video at the Channel O Music Video Awards
At the end of 2009 Zeus had an impressive victory at the 2009 Channel O Music Video Awards when he beat out competition from the likes of Hip Hop Pantsula ("All I Need" video), Okyeame Kwame ("Woso" video), Jay Ru ("Big Boi Anthem" video), Pro ("Uthini Ngo Pro"), and Black Rhino ("Black Chata") to win Best Hip Hop Video for "Gijima".

2009: The Flipside 
18 December saw Zeus release his second album, The Flipside. The album was distributed by Soul Candi Records and was a partnership between D.I.Y/Rizn Entertainment, Octave couplet and Big Dawg productions.
The album is made up of sixteen tracks and features the likes of RJ Benjamin, Don Juan, Stoan and Jon Jazi. Its most prominent singles have been "Out of my mind", "Diski Business" and its biggest hit to date, "Champagne Music". The video for "Champagne Music" has garnered him his third consecutive Channel O Music Video Award nomination – this time for Most Gifted Male Video. His video will be up against Wande Coal's "Bumper To Bumper", Banky W "Strong Thing", Black Coffee with the video for "Juju" featuring Bantwini and favourite K'NAAN's "T.I.A".

2010: "Beef" with Scar 
During a broadcast of their Yarona FM breakfast shows, The Real Enchilada (co-hosted with prominent media figure Tumi Ramsden), fellow Motswana rapper Scar displayed behaviour which did not amuse Zeus.
Ramsden had just played a new track from Zeus' album and said that she liked it.
Scar's opinion of the song was made apparent by a fake yawn.
This led Zeus to post a comment on his Facebook page and Scar did the same on his page. The "war of posts" continued back and forth.
The Voice reporter, Kabelo Dipholo asked both artists respectively about their feud via Facebook. Scar responded writing:

Zeus' version of their relationship was as follows:

2012: Honey I'm Home mixtape 
This is Zeus's 3rd official offering (set to be released 23 November 2012) and it is a mixtape that as the name suggests represents; firstly Zeus's return from a two-year hiatus, since 2009's critically acclaimed The Flipside album, and secondly his inauguration and coronation to the forefront of local as well as African hip hop as a whole. The 13 track masterpiece was recorded at Bedrock Studios and features production from long time collaborator Octave Couplet's Don Juan, new OC recruits K-Zo and Bash Boi as well as Rimzy and Bally from Heavensent Productions. The mixtape / freetape features verses from AKA, Tumi from the volume, Hydro, Don Juan, Thato_daPoet, Vusi, long time friend and collaborator KEB as well as up and comer Ozi F. Teddy.

2013–2014: African Time 
On 6 December 2013 Zeus dropped his third album and currently his most commercially successful album, African Time. It was preceded by the hit single "#Datswatsapp" featuring famous South African rappers AKA and Tumi Molekane. This single was nominated for a Channel 0 VMA for most gifted male video. Others singles released include "MaAfrika" and "Psych", all of which were released to critical acclaim.

Explaining the inspiration behind the album, which is a deviation from previous releases that tended to celebrate his lyricism as a hip hop artist, he said,

 
His current offering is characterized by a heavy African influence and focuses less on braggadocio and more on content and messages. The name of the album is a reflective trip through the beautiful landscapes and variety that is Africa.
 
According to Zeus the album title is a clever play on words:

 
The 15-track album boasts heavyweight collaborations with renowned artists and producers including Tumi, Kwela Tebza, Mahotella Queens, Mzekezeke, Ross Jack, Nonku Phiri and Ammara Brown among others. Motswako artist Tebogo Mapine popularly known as Nomadic designed the album cover.
 
"I find him very understanding because he is a very proud African and an artist himself, so when I mentioned the album title he had a concept in mind," Zeus said.
"When I read the book Capitalist Nigga years ago in my late teens, it really resonated with me and to this day I feel like it's probably one of the inspirational books that has formed my outlook on life. Therefore the inspiration of this album to me is Africanism and the biggest philosophy is how we do things. We see in other cultures, for example Chinese people, their business principles stem from their tradition. How come it seems as though there is no connection between what we were yesterday and what we are today? Obviously that leads to a concern of who we will we be tomorrow when we don't have these identity cues."
 
The second single, "Fast Five" which also enjoyed airplay on local radio stations has kwasakwasa influence and when asked about the concept Zeus said, "We need to understand that music is inspired by other music. I am a very big crossover artist; my track Imagination was dancehall fused and Dancing shoes is a house tune. I have never limited myself to just being a rapper. I consider myself as an artist.   For me that kwasa sound is a very strong traditional rhythm and it does not matter where you are in Africa. It only makes sense to make sounds that our parents can also relate to hence bridging the gap between the young and old."

2014–present: Touch the Sky 
In 2014 Zeus released a single "Touch the Sky" for Sky Girls BW. The single was made to motivate, inspire and encourage teenage girls in situations like peer pressure. Zeus released a single FEVER featuring Mizo Phyll from South Africa.

Causes 
Zeus has lent his talent and time to various organisations and causes which include: Childline Botswana, Oxfam International, Youth Health Organization (YOHO), a PEPFAR supported program dedicated to reducing new HIV infections among Batswana youth and most recently TeachAids. He has also championed for progress and growth in the Botswana Music Industry.

Business ventures 
A self-proclaimed serial entrepreneur in the creative arts, Zeus is founder and director of his own entertainment company that has previously released his work independently and in partnership with other independent and major record labels. After completing a postgraduate degree in Film and TV in 2016, the venture is set to take on production as part of its portfolio, with content already in different stages of development. In 2014 he joined a partnership that would result in the founding of Jam For Brunch, a popular monthly event in Botswana's capital that has changed the Sunday leisure market.

Discography 
 Freshly Baked (2008)
 The Flipside (2009)
 African Time (2013)

Further reading 
Zeus Biography

See also 

 Vee Mampeezy
 Ross Branch
 Sasa Klaas
 Charma Gal

References 

Living people
1986 births
People from Serowe
Botswana musicians